Sued for Libel is a 1939 American mystery film directed by Leslie Goodwins from a screenplay by Jerry Cady, based on Wolfe Kaufman's story. Released on October 27, 1939, by RKO Radio Pictures (who also produced it), the film stars Kent Taylor, Linda Hayes, Lilian Bond, and Morgan Conway.

Cast
 Kent Taylor as Steve Lonegan
 Linda Hayes as Maggie Shane
 Lilian Bond as Mrs. Muriel Webster
 Morgan Conway as Albert Pomeroy
 Richard Lane as Smiley Dugan
Roger Pryor as District Attorney Willard Corbin
 Thurston Hall as David Hastings
 Emory Parnell as Jerome Walsh
 Roy Gordon as Colonel Jasper White
 Edward Earle as Judge  Samuel Clark
 Lester Dorr as Pomeroy's butler

References

External links

RKO Pictures films
Films scored by Roy Webb
Films directed by Leslie Goodwins
American black-and-white films
Films produced by Cliff Reid
American mystery drama films
1930s mystery drama films
1939 drama films
1939 films
1930s English-language films
1930s American films